Roberto González Valdés (born March 31, 1976, in Mexico City) is a Mexican racing driver from Monterrey. He competed in Champ Car in the 2003 season and for all of 2004. In 2003, he made his debut in the race at St. Petersburg in Florida for Dale Coyne Racing failing to complete the race. His other appearance in 2003 was at home in Mexico City where he substituted for veteran Roberto Moreno scoring his 1st Champ Car points in 10th spot.

He was given a full-time ride with PKV Racing for the 2004 season complete with backing from the Mexican arm of Nextel. However, he had a disappointing year with a best result of 7th place in Cleveland highlighting a year where he only finished 15th in the points standings. He was not retained for the 2005 season.

In 2012 he drove in three races for RSR Racing in the American Le Mans Series.

In 2013 his younger brother Ricardo won the 81st edition of the 24 Hours of Le Mans in LMP2. In 2019, Roberto went on to win the 24 Hours of Daytona and the 6 Hours of Spa-Francorchamps, both in the LMP2 class.

In the 90th edition of the 2022 24 Hours of Le Mans Roberto obtains the first position in the LMP2 class after 6 attempts. González teamed up with Will Stevens and António Félix da Costa. They would all later win the 2022 FIA World Endurance Championship for LMP2. 

González is also the founder of Mexican investment management company Soliq.

Racing record

Racing career summary

† As González was a guest driver, he was ineligible to score championship points.

Complete American Open-Wheel Racing results
(key)

CART/Champ Car World Series

 ^ New points system implemented in 2004

Complete FIA World Endurance Championship results

* Season still in progress.

24 Hours of Le Mans results

Complete WeatherTech SportsCar Championship

References

External links
 Roberto Gonzalez Driver Bio from the Champ Car World Series official website

1976 births
Champ Car drivers
Living people
Mexican racing drivers
Racing drivers from Mexico City
American Le Mans Series drivers
FIA World Endurance Championship drivers
24 Hours of Le Mans drivers
24 Hours of Daytona drivers
WeatherTech SportsCar Championship drivers
Manor Motorsport drivers
HVM Racing drivers
KV Racing Technology drivers
Dale Coyne Racing drivers
DragonSpeed drivers
Jota Sport drivers
AFS Racing drivers
Greaves Motorsport drivers